Nankichi may refer to:

 (1913–1943), Japanese writer
5288 Nankichi, main-belt asteroid

Japanese masculine given names